is a Japanese voice actress who works for Ken Production. She is known as the voice of Kouya Marino in Crush Gear Turbo.

Selected filmography

Television animation
009-1 – TonyBeyblade G-Revolution – (Ep. 9)Cardfight!! Vanguard G: NEXT – Saori FuchidakaCardfight!! Vanguard G: Z – Saori FuchidakaCrush Gear Turbo – Kouya MarinoD.I.C.E. – Sam N'DoolDeath Parade – Jiro (Ep. 5)Dinosaur King – Ryuta Kodai (Max Taylor)Dramatical Murder – Nao KuniyashiFantasista Doll – Kaiyo YamadaFree! – Haruka Nanase (child)Gakuen Alice – Kokoroyomi-kunGa-Rei Zero – Kazuhiro MitogawaHajime no Ippo: New Challenger – Wataru TakamuraHigurashi When They Cry – Daiki TomitaHunter × Hunter (2011) – Spinner ClowKuromajo-san ga Toru!! – Shou SanjouLe Chevalier D'Eon – RobinMachine Robo Rescue – Ken MinamiMirai Nikki – Marco Ikusaba (child)Paranoia Agent – (Ep. 12)Rideback – Suzuri UchidaRozen Maiden – Kazuki ShibasakiSamurai Champloo – Izumi (Ep. 6)Shuffle! – Rin Tsuchimi (child)Star Ocean EX – YukiThe Disappearance of Nagato Yuki-chan – KunikidaThe Melancholy of Haruhi Suzumiya – KunikidaYakitate!! Japan – Shadow White (child)Yattermen! – Chiaki-kun (Ep. 42)

Original net animation (ONA)KY Kei JC Kuuki-chan – Betao Joseki

Drama CDReverse/End – Senju (child)Wild Adapter – Shouta

Video gamesCrush Gear Turbo (PlayStation) – Kouya MarinoEverybody's Tennis – JJKajiri Kamui Kagura – Sojiro MibuSamurai Shodown IV – RimururuSuzumiya Haruhi no Tomadoi – KunikidaSuzumiya Haruhi no Tsuisō – Kunikida

Dubbing rolesAtonement, Briony Tallis (Saoirse Ronan)Oscar's Oasis – PopyPhineas and Ferb – Stacy Hirano (2nd voice)Shuriken School – Eizan KaburagiSpider-Man Unlimited'' – Shane Yamada-Jones

References

External links
Official agency profile 

1977 births
Living people
Japanese video game actresses
Japanese voice actresses
Ken Production voice actors
Voice actresses from Kumamoto Prefecture
20th-century Japanese actresses
21st-century Japanese actresses